The 2012 Football League Trophy Final was the 29th final of the domestic football cup competition for teams from Football Leagues One and Two, the Football League Trophy. The final was played at Wembley Stadium in London on 25 March 2012. The match was contested between Chesterfield from League One and Swindon Town from League Two. Chesterfield won the game 2–0.

Match details

Statistics 

Source: BBC Sport

Post match
Chesterfield manager, John Sheridan spoke of his desire to keep Chesterfield in League One saying of the game "It's great for the fans and it's a trophy – I won't disrespect it. But I know where my loyalties lie and I'm desperate to stay in the division". Swindon manager, Paolo Di Canio described his players as mentally weak saying "Today we deserved to be a loser because we were all weak".

References

 

2012
Chesterfield F.C. matches
2012 sports events in London
Swindon Town F.C. matches
Events at Wembley Stadium 
2011–12 Football League